This is a list of presidents of the Diet ("Tagsatzung") of the Swiss Confederation (before 1848).

For the period since the creation of  Switzerland as a federal state in 1848, the List of Presidents of the Swiss Confederation details the yearly President of the Confederation.

Hans von Reinhard-1814
Hans Konrad von Escher vom Luchs-1814
Johann Konrad Finsler-1814
David von Wyss II-1814-1815
Hans von Reinhard-1816
Niklaus Rudolf von Wattenwyl-1817
Niklaus Friedrich von Mülinen-1818
Josef Karl Xaver Leopold Leodegar Amrhyn-1819
Vinzenz Rüttimann-1820
David von Wyss II-1821
Hans von Reinhard-1822
Niklaus Rudolf von Wattenwyl-1823
Niklaus Friedrich von Mülinen-1824
Josef Karl Xaver Leopold Leodegar Amrhyn-1825
Vinzenz Rüttimann-1826
David von Wyss II-1827
Hans von Reinhard-1828
Niklaus Rudolf von Wattenwyl-1829
Emanuel Friedrich von Fischer-1830
Josef Karl Xaver Leopold Leodegar Amrhyn-1831
Eduard Pfyffer von Altishoven-1832
Johann Jakob Hess-1833
Konrad Melchior Hirzel-1834
Franz Karl von Tavel-1835
Karl Friedrich Tscharner-1836
Josef Karl Xaver Leopold Leodegar Amrhyn-1837
Georg Jakob Kopp-1838
Johann Jakob Hess-1839
Johann Konrad von Muralt-1840
Johann Karl Friedrich Neuhaus-1841
Karl Friedrich Tscharner-1842
Rudolf Rüttimann-1843
Konstantin Siegwart-Müller-1844
Johann Heinrich Emmanuel Mousson-1845
Jonas Furrer, (1805-1861), 1845
Johann Ulrich Zehnder-1846
Alexander Ludwig Funk-1847
Ulrich Ochsenbein, (1811-1890), 1847
Johann Rudolf Schneider-1847
Ulrich Ochsenbein, (1811-1890), 1847-1848
Alexander Ludwig Funk-1848

See also 
 List of officials of the Helvetic Republic#Presidents of the Directory (1798-1800)
 Landammann#Confederal (1802-1813)

Switzerland history-related lists
List of Presidents of the Swiss Diet
Lists of political office-holders in Switzerland